Cor Caroli  is a binary star designated Alpha Canum Venaticorum or α Canum Venaticorum. The International Astronomical Union uses the name "Cor Caroli" specifically for the brighter star of the binary. Alpha Canum Venaticorum is the brightest point of light in the northern constellation of Canes Venatici.

Nomenclature

α Canum Venaticorum, Latinised to Alpha Canum Venaticorum, is the system's Bayer designation. The brighter of the two stars is designated α2 Canum Venaticorum, the fainter α1 Canum Venaticorum.

In the western world Alpha Canum Venaticorum had no name until the 17th century, when it was named Cor Caroli, which means "Charles's Heart". There has been some uncertainty whether it was named in honour of King Charles I of England, who was executed in 1649 during the English Civil War, or of his son, Charles II, who restored the English monarchy to the throne in 1660. The name was coined in 1660 by Sir Charles Scarborough, physician to Charles II, who claimed the star seemed to shine exceptionally brightly on the night of Charles II's return to England. In Star Names, R.H. Allen claimed that Scarborough suggested the name to Edmond Halley and intended it to refer to Charles II. However, Robert Burnham Jr. notes that "the attribution of the name to Halley appears in a report published by J. E. Bode at Berlin in 1801, but seems to have no other verification". In Star Tales, Ian Ridpath points out that the name's first appearance on a star map was in the 1673 chart of Francis Lamb, who labelled it Cor Caroli Regis Martyris ('the heart of Charles the martyred king'), clearly indicating that it was seen as referring to Charles I.

In 2016, the International Astronomical Union organized a Working Group on Star Names (WGSN) to catalog and standardize proper names for stars. The WGSN's first bulletin of July 2016 included a table of the first two batches of names approved by the WGSN; which included Cor Caroli for the star α2 Canum Venaticorum.

From this Chinese name, the name Chang Chen was derived.

Stellar properties

Alpha Canum Venaticorum is a binary star with a combined apparent magnitude of 2.81. The two stars are 19.6 arcseconds apart in the sky and are easily resolved in small telescopes. The system lies approximately 110 light-years from the Sun.

It marks the northern vertex of the asterism known as the Great Diamond or the Diamond of Virgo.

α2 Canum Venaticorum

α2 Canum Venaticorum has a spectral type of A0, and has an apparent visual magnitude which varies between 2.84 and 2.98, with a period of 5.47 days. It is a chemically peculiar star with a strong magnetic field, about 5,000 times as strong as the Earth's, and is also classified as an Ap/Bp star. Its atmosphere has overabundances of some elements, such as silicon, mercury and europium. This is thought to be due to some elements sinking down into the star under the force of gravity while others are elevated by radiation pressure. This star is the prototype of a class of variable stars, the so-called α2 Canum Venaticorum variables. The strong magnetic field of these stars is believed to produce starspots of enormous extent. Due to these starspots the brightness of α2 Canum Venaticorum stars varies considerably during their rotation.

α1 Canum Venaticorum
α1 Canum Venaticorum is an F-type main-sequence star. It is considerably fainter than its companion and has an apparent visual magnitude of approximately 5.60.

Namesakes
Cor Caroli was a U.S. Navy Crater-class cargo ship named after the star.

References

Canes Venatici
Canum Venaticorum, Alpha
Canum Venaticorum, 12
112412
063121
A-type main-sequence stars
F-type main-sequence stars
Binary stars
Alpha2 Canum Venaticorum variables
Stars with proper names
Durchmusterung objects
4914
TIC objects